For You I Have Sinned is a 1953 Italian melodrama film directed by Mario Costa and starring Pierre Cressoy, Milly Vitale and Frank Latimore.

Cast
 Pierre Cressoy as Guido
 Milly Vitale as Elena
 Frank Latimore as Reder
 Aldo Silvani as Dott. Martini
 Maria Laura Rocca as Anna
 Gianfranco Nicostra  as Luigino
 Oscar Andriani as Il Commissario
 Bianca Doria as Agnese Reder
 Gino Sinimberghi as Cantano
 Liliana Bonfatti as Ines
 Ornella Moscucci as Cantano
 Orchestra e Coro del Teatro dell'Opera di Roma as Themselves

References

Bibliography
 James Robert Parish & Kingsley Canham. Film Directors Guide: Western Europe. Scarecrow Press, 1976.

External links

1953 films
1953 drama films
Italian drama films
1950s Italian-language films
Films directed by Mario Costa
Films scored by Renzo Rossellini
Italian black-and-white films
Melodrama films
1950s Italian films